Uncharactarized protein C1orf127 is a protein that in humans is encoded by the C1orf127 gene, the structure and function of which is poorly understood by the scientific community. C1orf127 is targeted for extracellular secretion in humans.

Gene
C1orf127 is located on the short arm of Chromosome 1 (1p36.22), spanning 35,566 base pairs from 10946471 to 10982037. It is oriented on the minus strand of the chromosome.

mRNA
The primary assembly has 13 exons, and yields an 823 amino acid protein product. There are two known isoforms caused by alternative splicing.

Protein
C1orf127’s protein product is a member of the Ensembl protein family TF607005. The primary assembly weighs 89 kDa with an isoelectric point of 5.54, making it both longer and heavier than the average protein.

Domains and Motifs
C1orf127 is contains two protein domains: DUF4556 and PHA03247, a domain in the Atrophin-1 superfamily.  The functions of both domains are unknown. The protein also appears to have a cleavable signal peptide from Met1 to Pro18.

Subcellular Localization
The protein C1orf127 is suggested to be localized to the extracellular matrix in humans.

Post-Translational Modifications
C1orf127 undergoes N and O-linked glycosylation, and contains a number of potential phosphorylation sites.

Protein-Protein Interactions
C1orf127 is suggested to interact with two different proteins, CCT3, a molecular chaperone, and CCT6B, also a molecular chaperone found in the testis. Because these interacting proteins are both molecular chaperones, it is possible that C1orf127 must undergo chaperone-assisted folding or unfolding.

Expression
C1orf127 is not constitutively expressed, but it is expressed at low to medium levels in a variety of tissues. Greatest expression is observed in the stomach and pancreas. It is also thought to be expressed in certain areas of both the developing and adult brain, such as the cerebellum, as well as skeletal muscle tissue, the testis, cardiac muscle, and throughout the digestive system.

Little else is known about this gene’s expression, however a 2012 paper published in the World Journal of Gastroenterology suggested that it’s mis-expression could be used as a diagnostic marker locus in the detection of cancer

Evolutionary History

C1orf127 has no paralogs within the human genome, however a number of orthologs have been identified, ranging across the jawed vertebrates, including a number of other mammals, marsupials, amphibians, and fish. One of the most distant ortholog identified is found in Danio rerio. Thus, the ancestor of C1orf127 likely arose around 435 MYA.

References

C1orf127

Genes on human chromosome 1